The 2005–06 Interliga season was the seventh season of the multi-national ice hockey league. Seven teams participated in the league, and Jesenice from Slovenia have won the championship.

Regular season

Play-offs

Quarter-finals

Semi-finals

Final

Final ranking
Jesenice
Alba Volán Székesfehérvár
Olimpija
Slavija
Újpesti TE
Dunaújvárosi Acélbikák
Medveščak

External links
Season on www.hockeyarchives.info

Interliga (1999–2007) seasons
2005–06 in European ice hockey leagues
Inter